This is a list of properties and districts in Barrow County, Georgia that are listed on the National Register of Historic Places (NRHP).

Current listings

|}

References

Barrow
Barrow County, Georgia
National Register of Historic Places in Barrow County, Georgia